Raahui Pookeka-Huntly Railway Station (formerly Huntly Railway Station) is on the North Island Main Trunk line and the Awaroa Branch in the town of Huntly in the Waikato District of New Zealand,  south of Auckland. The station was named Raahui Pookeka-Huntly for its reopening for the new Te Huia train on 6 April 2021.

History 
The station opened on 13 August 1877, originally as Huntley Lodge or Ruawaro c1878, and Huntley from 1879 up to 1882, though all 3 names had been used locally since at least 1877. On 21 May 1972 the station was closed.

The station was enlarged in 1893. It had a Class 4 station building, described, in 1902, as built of wood and iron, with, "a large waiting room, ladies' waiting room, a lamp and luggage room, and the post and telegraph office. There is also a goods shed, and an engine and coaling shed for the engine. About ten trains daily pass through the station, and the staff consists of five hands, besides the stationmaster."

Traffic grew steadily (see graph and table below) so, in March 1920, the Town Board set out the need for a larger station. Requests were dismissed until, on 2 July 1936,  the First Labour Government's new Minister of Railways said that provided the Government was re elected, a new station building would be provided.

By 1925 there were 13 staff and 3 locomotives at Huntly engine shed.

1939 station 
The new station opened on 28 May 1939, with Stationmaster, waiting, porters and parcels rooms. A 55 lever electric frame operated the newly doubled lines and extended yard. The old station was demolished to allow a platform extension.

Freight was also growing. In 1919 the Chief Traffic Manager reported that there was insufficient room and by 1924 the growth of coal mining had increased business a further 25%. A plan was made to enlarge the yard and move it south of the Awaroa Branch.

Closure and removal 
In 1993 Huntly Lions Club repainted the station and the 1939 footbridge at the north end of the platform was moved to Helensville, though it couldn't be used, as too few parts survived for it to be safe. It had been raised to allow the SH1 bypass to be built in 1978 on the site of 2 shunting lines. Access was then only from Rayners Rd.

The Overlander continued to call at Huntly until 2005.

In 2008 the 1939 building was moved as part of plans to shift Waikato Coalfields Museum to Lake Puketirini (former Weavers opencast coal mine), the most vandalised park in the district. The museum plan was further discussed in 2017. In 2021 it was proposed that the building be moved back to the station for use as a museum and by Te Huia passengers.

Reopening 
Originally on an island platform between the up and down lines, the replacement station was on a siding, so trains travelled at "yard" speed, and northbound trains had to cross over the southbound track.

$960,000 was to be spent to renovate the station for the new Te Huia service, originally promised for 2019, then delayed to March 2020, then 3 August 2020 and, finally, Tuesday 6 April 2021.

The shelter and platform needed upgrading plus "park-and-ride" facilities and a pedestrian overbridge to the town centre. By October 2020, the new shelter was largely complete, and the carpark was to be finished in November.

The indicative start-up service timetable was:

Huntly was named after Huntly in Aberdeenshire, Scotland.

Gallery

References

External links 
Timetables
 current timetable
 1877, 1879, 1880, Feb 1882, Mar 1882, Sep 1882, Jan 1883, Mar 1883

Photos

 
 Sir George Grey Special Collections, Auckland Libraries photos – 1895, 1908, 1909, 1912, 1913, 1933
1909 new tablet exchanger and passenger train
 National Library – 1946 map, aerial views – 1949 from south, north, 1951 from north, 1954 from east, 1959 from west, 1961 from north, 1972 from south, north, 1980 from east
1951 photos of 'change for Glen Afton' sign and station and yard
1952 photo of station and engine shed
1985 photo with Silver Fern railcar
 2016 at Puketirini
 Google Street View of station site and vote trains sign
 Video of 25 March 2021 renaming ceremony, with brief shots of Prime Minister, Minister of Local Government and Minister of Transport

Railway stations in New Zealand
Buildings and structures in Waikato
Rail transport in Waikato
Railway stations opened in 1877
Railway stations closed in 2005
Huntly, New Zealand
1877 establishments in New Zealand